"Let the Good Times Roll" is a song that was recorded by Shirley and Lee in 1956.  This song was written by the duo, Shirley Goodman (later Shirley Pixley) and Leonard Lee,

Chart performance
By September 8, 1956, the Shirley & Lee recording had climbed to number 20 in the US chart, and a 1960 re-recording went to number 47.

Background
The song has a strong steady beat provided by prolific studio drummer Earl Palmer.

Notable cover versions
Bunny Sigler covered it as a medley along with the song "Feels So Good", peaking at number 20 on the Top Selling R&B Singles chart and number 22 on the Billboard Hot 100 (1967)
 Harry Nilsson covered it on his 1971 album Nilsson Schmilsson.

Popular culture
"Let the Good Times Roll" has appeared on numerous compilation albums, and features in the films Apocalypse Now, Stand By Me and Manchester by the Sea.

Commercial usage
The song appears in a 2018 TV commercial for Walmart.

References

1956 songs
1956 singles
Shirley and Lee songs
Rhythm and blues songs
Aladdin Records singles